Propebela monterealis is a species of sea snail, a marine gastropod mollusk in the family Conidae, the cone snails and their allies.

Description
The length of the shell is 12 mm, its diameter 5.3 mm.

(Original description) The shell is very similar to Curtitoma trevelliana trevelliana, but larger, with the same number of whorls, the ribs less numerous, more emphatic, with wider interspaces, and a less conspicuous cord at the shoulder.

Distribution
This marine species was found in Monterey Bay, California, USA.

References

Further reading
 

monterealis
Gastropods described in 1919